The Maloti-Drakensberg Park is a World Heritage Site, established on 11 June 2001 by linking the Sehlabathebe National Park in the Kingdom of Lesotho and the uKhahlamba Drakensberg Park in KwaZulu-Natal, South Africa. The highest peak is Thaba Ntlenyana rising to 3.482 m.

The merged park includes Golden Gate Highlands National Park, QwaQwa National Park and Sterkfontein Dam Nature Reserve, (Free State); uKhahlamba Drakensberg Park and Royal Natal National Park (KwaZulu-Natal) and Sehlabathebe National Park (Lesotho).

The park is situated in the Drakensberg Mountains which form the highest areas in the sub-region, and supports unique montane and sub-alpine ecosystems. These ecosystems hold a globally significant plant and animal biodiversity, with unique habitats and high levels of endemism. The park is also home to the greatest gallery of rock art in the world with hundreds of sites and many thousands of images painted by the Bushmen (San people).

The Maloti-Drakensberg Transfrontier Conservation and Development Area was conceived as a Peace park, covering about 8 113 km², made up of 5 170 km² (64%) in Lesotho and 2 943 km² (36%) in KwaZulu-Natal.

See also 

 List of conservation areas of South Africa

References

External links
 KwaZulu-Natal Provincial Government homepage
 Ezemvelo KZN Wildlife (previous known as Natal Parks Board)
 Peace Parks
 Maloti-Drakensberg Transfrontier Conservation Area Website
 Maloti Drakensberg Transfrontier Challenge Adventure Race

Peace parks
Protected areas of Lesotho
Protected areas of South Africa
Protected areas established in 2001
2001 establishments in South Africa
World Heritage Sites in Lesotho
World Heritage Sites in South Africa